Amaoba is an Oboro community in Ikwuano Local Government Area of Abia State, Nigeria. It consists of two autonomous sister villages, namely Amaoba Ime and Amaoba Ikputu. Abaa Ukwu, Amaoba Ime and Ikputu Oboro are the three autonomous communities of Amaoba. It is 13 km away from the state's capital, Umuahia.

History

There was a man named Odugbo Ajonu. It happened that, when Mazi Odugbo quarrelled with his family in Alayi near Uzuakoli and came to settle at one corner of the place now known as Oboroland. He left with his junior brother Mazi Idima, who decided to settle at the present Abam. There, he met his own luck. Mazi Odugbo Ajonu was born a warrior. He warred irrespective of relation, hence his relatives ejected him out from Alayi. When he first entered into the Oboroland, he begat his first son and named him Eme Aba, which means that as he warred on, he still planned for more wars. (i.e the present Amaoba, who were at Olori). Under the same wife, he begat Mazi Akputu being the present 'Ikputu' which is his second son.
 
When his near and far neighbours could not bear his unexpected war attacks he was forced to another unoccupied area, there he begat Mazi Ututu (Izuzu Ututu). Ututu was nicknamed 'Oru' by which the present Ndioru was named after.
 
Mazi Odugbo Ajonu also begat Mazi Eme Agwara now at Umuogwara Nnono, Mazi Ebula Ọgụ now Ogbuebulle, Mazi Awuru Ogu, now Umu Awuru at Ibere and Mazi Odu, now the Lodu at Ibeku.
 
The present war house (god) at Amaoba Ime named Agbala was captured during a big war between Amaoba and his brothers against the then Umuchichi. When Umuchichi was conquered and captured, their war god (Agbala) was also captured at Amaoba. In those days, when the entire Oboro nation settled at Olori, to get water for any use was very tough.
 
During Mazi Eme Aba's stay at Olori, he begat Mazi Umo, Ulu and Ohia under one wife, and begat Mazi Otugh, Okele and Ika under the junior wife. Ndaeri, Umuohia are part and parcel of Umu Umo.
 
'Ikputu' was derived from 'Akpautu' which means one who does not follow the advice of others. Ikputu was of the same mother with Amaoba Ime. Ikputu was the first to be ejected from Olori before Amaoba Ime. It happened that a cow belonging to one Mazi Agbaike of Ikputu was discovered in Anya Ikputu in the same way Mazi Adindu's cow of Amaoba Ime was discovered in Odokiri. Ikputu was removed from near the waters.
 
Mazi Akputu begat three sons; Ukala (Azukala), Etiti (Etiti Ulo) and Enwe (Umu Enwe). Their market day is Orie Uku They took care of Amaoba's general god named Ikenga.

Sub-villages
The two communities (Amaoba Ime & Amaoba Ikputu) contain 9 sub-villages combined, namely;
 Azukala
 Etiti Ulo
 Umuenwe
 Umumo
 Ndiulu
 Umuohia
 Umuikaa
 Umuoshotugh
 Umuokele

See also
Abam
Ndoro

References

Populated places in Abia State

External links
https://www.esteegel.com/zipcode/oboro-amaoba-ime-ikwuano-abia-state-postal-code/
https://www.esteegel.com/zipcode/oboro-amaoba-ikputu-ikwuano-abia-state-postal-code/

Populated places in Abia State